The Columbus mayoral election of 1951 was the 69th mayoral election in Columbus, Ohio.  It was held on Tuesday, November 6, 1951.  During the primary nomination on August 14, 1951, the Columbus electorate nominated two Republicans, incumbent mayor Jim Rhodes and former mayor Floyd F. Green, to compete in the general election.  Incumbent mayor Rhodes defeated Green.

References

Bibliography

Columbus
Mayoral elections in Columbus, Ohio
Columbus